NGC 339 is a globular cluster in the constellation Tucana the Toucan. It is located both visually and physically in the Small Magellanic Cloud, being only about 10,000 ± 12,000 light years (3,000 ± 3,000 parsecs) closer than the cloud. It is rather prominent, being the brightest cluster in the southern reaches of the cloud. It was discovered by John Herschel on September 18, 1835. It was observed in 2005 by the Hubble Space Telescope. Its apparent V-band magnitude is 12.12, but at this wavelength, it has 0.19 magnitudes of interstellar extinction.

NGC 339 is about 6.3 billion years old. All else equal, older star clusters have higher mass-to-luminosity ratios; that is, they have lower luminosities for the same mass.

References

External links
 

Globular clusters
0339
18350918
Tucana (constellation)
Discoveries by John Herschel
Small Magellanic Cloud